Ulua may refer to:

 Ulúa River
 San Juan de Ulúa, a complex located on an island of the same name in the Gulf of Mexico
 USS Ulua (SS-428), a submarine of the United States Navy
 Ulua (fish), a genus of fishes in the family Carangidae
 vernacular name of the species giant trevally (Caranx ignobilis), but not in genus Ulua proper
 Ulua people, an indigenous people of El Salvador and Nicaragua.